The 1925 Greek coup d’état was a coup in Greece that took place on June 25, 1925. It was led by General Theodore Pangalos. He quickly rose to power and by the next day he became the President of Greece.

Background 
In Late 1922 the Greco-Turkish War was raging across Western Turkey, the Burning of Smyrna had created many political unrest in Greece. Constantine I was forced to resign, eventually his son George, took power of Greece. 

Many of the people in Greece were furious that they had lost the war, so they led a revolution in Athens under the leadership of Nikolaos Plastiras, the Revolution was declared as a Revolutionary Committee.

References

History of Greece